Turei is a Māori and Romanian surname that may refer to the following people:
Alexandru Turei (b. 1952), Romanian boxer
Brown Turei (1924–2017), New Zealand Māori religious leader
Bronwyn Turei, New Zealand actress and singer
Metiria Turei (b. 1970), New Zealand politician and artist
Mohi Turei (c.1830–1914), New Zealand Māori tribal leader

See also
Dragon's Teeth (Star Trek: Voyager)

Māori-language surnames
Romanian-language surnames